Renzo Marangon (born 29 July 1955 in Porto Tolle) is an Italian politician from Veneto.

A member of Christian Democracy since 1974, he entered the Regional Council of Veneto in 1993, in replacement of Giulio Veronese. In 1993 he was also briefly Mayor of Rovigo. In 1994 he joined the United Christian Democrats and was elected to the Council the year later. Re-elected in 2000 for Forza Italia (party which he had joined in 1998), he was floor leader of the party for five years. From 2005 to 2010 he was regional minister of Territorial Affairs in Galan III Government. In 2010, having joined The People of Freedom, he was not re-elected to Regional Council, but re-entered the Council in 2014 by replacing his rival Maria Luisa Coppola.

References

Forza Italia politicians
Living people
1955 births
Members of the Regional Council of Veneto
Mayors of Rovigo